Shane Cooper is the name of:

Shane Cooper (artist), German installation artist
Shane Cooper (rugby league), New Zealand rugby league footballer